Mohammed Wasid (born 15 June 1973) is an Indian first-class cricketer who represented Rajasthan. He made his first-class debut for Rajasthan in the 1998-99 Ranji Trophy on 7 November 1998.

References

External links
 

1973 births
Living people
Indian cricketers
Rajasthan cricketers